Vanessa Nygaard (born March 13, 1975 in Scottsdale, Arizona) is a professional basketball coach and  former player in the Women's National Basketball Association (WNBA).  She currently serves as the head coach for the Phoenix Mercury. She is also the girls basketball head coach at Windward School in Los Angeles.

Stanford University 
After graduating from high school in Carlsbad, California, Nygaard attended Stanford University from 1993 to 1998, and was a star player for their women's basketball team, known as The Cardinal. During her time there, the team accumulated a combined 113-14 won-loss record, including an impressive 69-2 within the Pacific-10 Conference, and reached three Final Fours. Nygaard graduated in 1998, majoring in American Studies.

Playing career 
After graduating from Stanford, Nygaard began her six-year career in the WNBA. She was selected by the New York Liberty in the fourth round (39th overall pick) of the 1998 WNBA Draft. She missed the 1998 and most of the 1999 seasons due to injury, but joined the starting lineup with the Portland Fire team in 2000 and 2001 and with the Miami Sol team in 2002. She also played for the Cleveland Rockers, the Charlotte Sting, and the Los Angeles Sparks. Prior to the 2004 WNBA season began, Nygaard signed a free agent contract with the Houston Comets, but was waived by the team during training camp.  She signed another contract with the Comets prior to the 2005 season, but decided to announce her retirement instead. Her best season came with the Sol in 2002, when she averaged 7.9 points and 3.8 rebounds per game.

During the WNBA off-season, she played in professional basketball leagues in Europe, including Germany (2001), Spain (1999) and Italy (1998).

Coaching career 
In 2003, Nygaard became an assistant coach for the women's basketball team at California State University, Long Beach.  The following year, in June 2004, she was hired as an assistant coach with Pepperdine University.

In 2008, she was named as an assistant coach for the San Antonio Silver Stars and helped the team to appear in the WNBA finals, before losing to the Detroit Shock.  In January 2009, she was named as an assistant coach for the Washington Mystics where she spent just one season.

Nygaard took over as head coach of the girls' basketball team at Windward School in 2012-13. She has coached the team to three state titles, in 2013, 2017, and 2018.

In 2017, she joined USA Basketball as an assistant coach, helping lead the team during the 2017 FIBA America's Under-16 Championship and the 2018 FIBA Under-17 World Cup.

In 2021, she joined head coach Bill Laimbeer on the Las Vegas Aces staff as an assistant coach.

Nygaard was named as the head coach of the Phoenix Mercury on January 24, 2022.

 

|-
| align="left" | PHO
| align="left" |2022
| 36 || 15 || 21 |||| align="center" |4th in West|| 2 || 0 || 2 ||
| align="center" | Lost in First Round
|-class="sortbottom"
| align="left" |Career
| || 36 || 15 || 21 |||| || 2 || 0 || 2 ||

References

External links
Pepperdine University coaches profile and interview
April 27, 2005 Houston Comets press release of Nygaard's retirement from the WNBA
 January 6, 2009 Washington Mystics press release of Nygaard's joining the coaching staff

1975 births
Living people
American women's basketball players
American women's basketball coaches
Basketball coaches from Arizona
Basketball coaches from California
Basketball players from Scottsdale, Arizona
Basketball players from California
Charlotte Sting players
Cleveland Rockers players
LGBT basketball players
LGBT people from Arizona
Lesbian sportswomen
Los Angeles Sparks players
Miami Sol players
New York Liberty draft picks
New York Liberty players
Parade High School All-Americans (girls' basketball)
Pepperdine Waves women's basketball coaches
Phoenix Mercury coaches
Portland Fire players
Small forwards
Sportspeople from Carlsbad, California
Stanford Cardinal women's basketball players